Zhou Jihong (born 11 January 1965) is a Chinese diver who won the first gold medal for Chinese diving.

Sports career
Born in Wuhan on 1965, Zhou originally practiced gymnastics before switching to diving. In 1977, she entered the Hubei diving team and began to receive professional diving training. She won the national championship in 1981 and entered the Chinese women's diving team in 1982.

In 1984, during the 1984 Summer Olympics in Los Angeles, she replaced Lü Wei, after Lü suffered from an injury. In the women's 10 metre platform, she won the gold medal with a total score of 435.51 points becoming the first Chinese diver to win a gold medal in the Olympics. On the same year, she was named the best athlete of the year in women's platform diving by magazine Swimming World.

In 1998, she became the team leader of the Chinese diving team. Under her leadership, Fu Mingxia and Guo Jingjing won gold and silver medals in the women's 3 metre springboard at the 2000 Summer Olympics in Sydney. In the 2004 Summer Olympics in Athens, the Chinese diving team won 6 gold medals, 2 silver medals and 1 bronze medal.
At the 2008 Summer Olympics in Beijing, Zhou led the Chinese diving team in winning 7 gold medals.

In March 2014, Zhou was appointed chairman of the Athlete Committee by FINA and in November 2017, she served as the chairman of the Chinese Swimming Association. In January 2019, she served as a member of the Chinese Olympic Committee and in January 2020, she served as the chairman of China Diving Association. On 5 June 2021, at the FINA Congress held in Doha, Qatar, Zhou was elected Vice President of FINA, becoming the first female vice president in the organization's history.

On 14 July 2021, Zhou was assigned as the diving team leader within the Chinese sports delegation for the 2020 Summer Olympics.

Personal life
In 1986, she retired briefly in order to complete her studies in English at Peking University. After graduating in 1990, she continued to serve as the coach of the Chinese National Diving Team.

In 1992, Zhou married to Tian Bingyi, a former Chinese badminton player and now the coach of Chinese national badminton team. In 1994, she gave birth to her son.

Controversy
In May 2022, New Zealand diving judge Lisa Wright revealed that during the 2020 Summer Olympics, Zhou allegedly launched a verbal tirade at Wright at the conclusion of the men's 10m platform final. Wright alleged that Zhou verbally abused her for underscoring Chinese divers. As a result, Zhou was later ordered by a FINA Ethics Panel to write a letter of apology to Wright. A recommendation was also made by the Ethics Panel to disestablish Zhou's position as Diving Bureau Liaison for FINA.

Former diver, judge and current member of FINA's Diving Technical Committee from New Zealand Simon Latimer sent a whistleblower complaint to FINA's executive director Brent Nowicki in December 2021 detailing Zhou's alleged "unethical behavior" which also contained allegations that Zhou has routinely coached Chinese divers during the Olympics and has manipulated judging panels in order to benefit Chinese athletes. In their findings the FINA Ethics Panel determined it had no jurisdiction to decide on any of the complaints under the Rules of Protection from Harassment and Abuse. It also stated there was not enough evidence to sustain complaints, saying the incident during the men's platform final was "unfortunate" and led to a "misunderstanding mixed with misjudgement" between Wright and Zhou.

Subsequent to Latimer's complaint, video evidence emerged and was posted online showing Zhou coaching Chinese divers during competition sessions at the 2020 Summer Olympics, a behavior considered unethical given her neutral role as a FINA Vice President and Diving Bureau Liaison.

See also
 List of members of the International Swimming Hall of Fame

References

External links

1965 births
Living people
Chinese female divers
Divers at the 1984 Summer Olympics
Divers at the 1992 Summer Olympics
Olympic divers of China
Olympic gold medalists for China
Olympic medalists in diving
Asian Games medalists in diving
Sportspeople from Wuhan
Divers at the 1982 Asian Games
Medalists at the 1984 Summer Olympics
Asian Games silver medalists for China
Medalists at the 1982 Asian Games
Universiade medalists in diving
Universiade silver medalists for China
Medalists at the 1983 Summer Universiade
World Aquatics Championships medalists in diving
Peking University alumni